The Illinois State Redbirds are the athletic teams that represent Illinois State University in Normal, Illinois. Teams play at the NCAA Division I level (FCS in football).  The football team competes in the Missouri Valley Football Conference while most other teams compete in the Missouri Valley Conference. The fight song is Go, You Redbirds.

History

Athletics at Illinois State consists of 19 sports, having won 160 MVC league titles.

Illinois State began its athletics program more than 100 years ago. In 1923, athletics director Clifford E. "Pop" Horton and the Daily Pantagraph sports editor Fred Young collaborated to change the university's nickname from "Teachers." Horton wanted "Cardinals" because the colors were cardinal and white (set in 1895–96). Young changed the nickname to "Red Birds" to avoid confusion in the headlines with the St. Louis Cardinals. It took roughly 10 years for Red Birds to become one word.

From approximately 1908 to 1970, Illinois State was affiliated with the Illinois Intercollegiate Athletic Conference and were charter members. The school, which had already been an NCAA Division I competitor for a decade, left behind its independent status in 1980 and affiliated itself with the Missouri Valley Conference. From 1981 to 1992, Redbird women's teams competed under the Gateway Collegiate Athletic Conference banner before women's sports were absorbed into the Missouri Valley Conference. Today, 14 of the 17 Redbird sports compete in the Missouri Valley Conference, with the football team playing in the Missouri Valley Football Conference, formerly known as the Gateway Football Conference.

Redbird 7

On 7 April 2015, seven men died when a privately owned Cessna 414 carrying Redbirds men's basketball coach Torrey Ward, Deputy Director of Athletics Aaron Leetch, and five community members and athletics supporters crashed. The group was returning from Indianapolis, where they attended the NCAA Men's Division I Basketball Championship Final. The plane crashed in a soybean field outside of Central Illinois Regional Airport in McLean County. The University and Athletics Department memorialized the victims in several ways, including a uniform patch worn by all 19 teams throughout the 2015–16 sports seasons. In addition, a permanent memorial called Redbird Remembrance directly in the heart of the Redbird Athletics.

Sports sponsored
A member of the Missouri Valley Conference, Illinois State University sponsors eight men's and eleven women's teams in NCAA sanctioned sports:

Men's basketball
Missouri Valley Conference Titles
Regular Season: 1984, 1992, 1993, 1997, 1998, 2017
Conference Tournament: 1983, 1990, 1997, 1998

NCAA Appearances: 1983, 1984, 1985, 1990, 1997, 1998

NIT Appearances: 1977, 1978, 1980, 1987, 1988, 1995, 1996, 2001, 2008, 2009, 2010, 2012, 2015, 2017

CBI Appearance: 2014

Women's basketball
Missouri Valley Conference Titles: 1983, 1989, 2005, 2008, 2009, 2022

NCAA Appearances: 1983, 1985, 1989, 2005, 2008, 2022

Women's National Invitation Tournament Appearances: 2007, 2009, 2010, 2011, 2012, 2013

During the 2007-2008 season, former Head Coach Dr. Jill Hutchison was recognized for her pioneering work in the advancement of women’s basketball.  A banner was hung from the rafters at Redbird Arena in her honor.
2009 Kristi Cirone becomes the all-time leading scorer.
December 28, 2009 Kristi Cirone's No. 10 jersey was retired at Redbird Arena.
March 13, 2020 - After the cancellation of NCAA postseason play, Redbird Women's Basketball earned a share of the 2020 NCAA Women's Basketball Championship.
Fell to Iowa in the first round of the 2022 NCAA Tournament, in their first appearance under Head Coach Kristen Gillespie.

Women's soccer
Missouri Valley Conference Regular Season Titles: 1998, 1999, 2001, 2003, 2007, 2008, 2009, 2011, 2013, 2014, 2016

Missouri Valley Conference Tournament Titles: 2003, 2009, 2011, 2012, 2013, 2014, 2016

NCAA Appearances: 2003, 2009, 2011, 2012, 2013, 2014, 2016

2016: W vs. Michigan (PKs), L vs. #3 Duke (1-3)

First season: 1996

All-Time Record: 225-145-37 (.600)

All-Time Missouri Valley Conference Record: 82-25-11 (.746)

10 Missouri Valley Conference Players of the Year

Football

Missouri Valley Football Conference Championships: 1999, 2014, 2015

NCAA Division I Football Championship Playoffs: 1998, 1999, 2006, 2012, 2014, 2015, 2016, 2019
1998: Lost at Northwestern State
1999: Defeated Colgate and Hofstra before losing at eventual National Champion Georgia Southern
2006: Lost at Youngstown State
2012: Defeated App State in overtime before losing at Eastern Washington
2014: Defeated UNI, Eastern Washington, and New Hampshire before losing to NDSU  in the FCS National Championship Game
2015: Defeated UNI before losing to Richmond
2016: Lost at Central Arkansas
2019: Defeated Southeast Missouri State, Central Arkansas, before losing to NDSU

FCS National Championship Game

Bowl Games

The 1999 & 2006 the Midwest Region Championship (FCS Quarterfinal) was referred to as the Pecan Bowl
In 1999 the Redbirds football team advanced to the Final Four and finished 3rd in the AP poll.
Illinois State holds the NCAA Division I FCS record for the most tied football games with 66.

Softball
Illinois State's softball team played in the Women's College World Series eight times in 1969, 1970, 1971, 1972, 1973, 1976, 1978 and 1981. The team finished as runner-up in the first WCWS in 1969, and in 1973, falling to Arizona State, 4-3, in 16 innings in the title game. On the day of the 1973 defeat, Redbirds pitcher Margie Wright heroically hurled 30 innings in three games. Ironically, for pitching too many innings in one day, a three-woman Illinois sports commission suspended her from pitching in any game in her upcoming senior season and also banned the softball team from post-season play in 1974.  Wright went on to play professional softball, followed by a 33-year head coaching career. She coached the Redbirds from 1980–85, followed by 27 years at Fresno State, where she became the first NCAA Division I softball coach to reach 1000 wins and the NCAA's all-time winningest softball coach.

National Championships

Team

Facilities 

Doug Collins Court at Redbird Arena – main indoor arena.
Hancock Stadium – football stadium.
Duffy Bass Field – baseball field.
Adelaide Street Field – soccer field.
McCormick Courts – outdoor tennis courts.
Marian Kneer Softball Stadium – softball field.
Weibring Golf Club – golf course.
Horton Field House
Evergreen Racquet Club – indoor tennis court.

Notable former athletes 
Football
Mike Zimmer – National Football League (NFL) Head Coach for the Minnesota Vikings
Joe Woods – NFL Defensive Coordinator for the Cleveland Browns
Nate Palmer – Former NFL inside linebacker for the Green Bay Packers and Tennessee Titans.
James O'Shaughnessy – NFL tight end for the Jacksonville Jaguars
James Robinson- NFL running back for the Jacksonville Jaguars
B. J. Bello – NFL defensive back for the Cleveland Browns
Davontae Harris – NFL defensive back for the Denver Broncos
Cameron Meredith – NFL wide receiver currently a Free Agent.
Cameron Lee – NFL offensive lineman currently a Free Agent.
Michael Liedtke – NFL offensive lineman for the Washington Football Team.
Kevin Glenn – Former Canadian Football League quarterback.
Colton Underwood – Former NFL tight end for the Oakland Raiders and Philadelphia Eagles and was a part of Season 14 of The Bachelorette.
Shelby Harris – NFL defensive end for the Denver Broncos
Boomer Grigsby – Retired NFL fullback and 2017 College Football Hall of Fame Inductee
Mike Prior – Former NFL player and part of Green Bay Packers team that won Super Bowl XXXI
Dennis Nelson – Former NFL player and part of Baltimore Colts team that won Super Bowl V
Tom Nelson – Former NFL wide receiver with the Cincinnati Bengals and the Philadelphia Eagles.
Aveion Cason – retired NFL Running back
Laurent Robinson – Retired NFL wide receiver.

Men's Basketball
Doug Collins – National Basketball Association broadcaster, player, coach, and Olympian.
Dan Muller – Current Illinois State men's basketball head coach.
Chamberlain Oguchi – Member of Nigeria's 2012 Summer Olympics team.
Steve Fisher – Former basketball head coach at Michigan, where he won a national title in 1989 and recruited the Fab Five, and San Diego State.
Tarise Bryson – Harlem Globetrotters (1998–2002).
Rico Hill – Was a guard for Illinois State prior to playing for the Los Angeles Clippers and in Europe.

Women's Basketball
Cathy Boswell – College Basketball All American and 1984 Summer Olympics Gold Medalist for United States women's national basketball team.
Charlotte Lewis – 1976 Summer Olympics Silver Medalist for the USA.
Kristi Cirone – Former WNBA point guard
Lorene Ramsey – Former Women's basketball coach of Illinois Central College, who with a career record of 887–197.

Baseball
Brock Stewart – Major League Baseball pitcher currently a Free Agent.
Paul DeJong – MLB shortstop for the St. Louis Cardinals.
Dave Bergman – Retired MLB player and World Series Champion (1984).
Matt Herges – Former MLB pitcher for the Florida Marlins and Cleveland Indians.
Neal Cotts – Former MLB pitcher with the Chicago White Sox, Chicago Cubs, Texas Rangers, Milwaukee Brewers, and Minnesota Twins. World Series Champion (2005).
Dan Kolb – Retired MLB relief pitcher.
Lee "Buzz" Capra – former Atlanta Braves pitcher who led the National League.

Track & Field
Tim Glover – 2011 & 2012 NCAA Division I Outdoor Track and Field Championships National Champion in Javelin Throw.
Aisha Praught – Former All-American & 2016 Summer Olympics athlete for Jamaica.

Softball
Margie Wright – Former professional softball player, coach for 33 years. NCAA all-time winningest softball coach.

Men's Golf
D. A. Weibring – Professional golfer on the PGA Tour.

Volleyball
Cathy George, women's volleyball head coach at Michigan State

References

External links
 

 

de:Illinois State University
no:Illinois State University